Shavit 2 (Hebrew: "comet" – שביט) is a small lift launch vehicle produced by Israel from 1982 onwards, to launch satellites into low Earth orbit. It was first launched on 19 September 1988 (carrying an Ofek-1 satellite payload), making Israel the eighth nation to have an orbital launch capability after the USSR, United States, France, Japan, People's Republic of China, United Kingdom, and India.

The Shavit 2 project is believed to have been an offshoot development, resulting from Israel's Jericho nuclear armed intercontinental ballistic missile (ICBM) program.

Shavit rockets are launched from Palmachim Airbase by the Israel Space Agency into highly retrograde orbits over the Mediterranean Sea to prevent debris coming down in populated areas and also to avoid flying over nations hostile to Israel to the east; this results in a lower payload-to-orbit than east-directed launches would allow. The launcher consists of three stages powered by solid-fuel rocket motors, with an optional liquid-fuel fourth stage, and is manufactured by Israel Aircraft Industries (IAI).

The Republic of South Africa produced and tested a licensed version in cooperation with Israel called the RSA-3 in an ultimately unsuccessful bid to produce a domestic satellite launch vehicle and ballistic missile; the South African program was closed in 1994.

An earlier unrelated project called Shavit 2 was the first Israeli sounding rocket, launched on 5 July 1961 for meteorological research.

Development 
The development of Shavit 2 began in 1982. Shavit was a three-stage, solid-propellant launcher designed to carry payloads up to 250 kg into low Earth orbit. It was speculated for some time and later confirmed that the first two stages of the Shavit were that of the Jericho II missile.

Shavit was first launched in 1988 and because of its geographic location and hostile relations with surrounding countries, Israel had to launch it to the west, over the Mediterranean Sea, in order to avoid flying over those hostile territories to its east. The practice has continued ever since.

Vehicle description 
The first of the Shavit vehicles were a small, 3-stage, solid-propellant booster based on the 2-stage Jericho-II ballistic missile and developed under the general management of Israel Aircraft Industries and in particular its MBT System and Space Technology subsidiary. Israel Military Industries Systems produces the first-stage and second-stage motors, while Rafael is responsible for the third-stage motor.

A planned commercial Shavit upgrade was called Next. This name is no longer used, and this proposed upgrade configuration is now called Shavit-2. Both first and second stages of the Shavit-2 use the stretched motor design of the Shavit-1 first stage.

Launch history 
The Shavit has been launched 11 times, placing the payload into orbit 9 times. On the 4th and 6th flights, the vehicle failed before reaching space. Most non-Israeli satellites are launched eastward to gain a boost from the Earth's rotational speed. However, the Shavit is launched westward (retrograde orbit) over the Mediterranean Sea to avoid flying and dropping spent rocket stages over populated areas in Israel and neighboring Arab countries. The Shavit is also said to be made available for commercial launches in the near future.

The September 2004 failure of the Shavit resulted in the destruction of the US$100 million Ofeq 6 spy satellite. Israel used Indian Polar Satellite Launch Vehicle in the subsequent launch for the TecSAR SAR satellite, while upgrading the Shavit launcher. On the upgraded Shavit 2, the follow-up Ofeq 7 was successfully launched on a Shavit rocket in 2007.

South African RSA series 

The Jericho II missile-Shavit SLV was also license produced in the Republic of South Africa as the RSA series of space launch vehicles and ballistic missiles. The RSA-3 was produced by the Houwteq (a discontinued division of Denel) company at Grabouw, 30 km east of Cape Town. Test launches were made from Overberg Test Range near Bredasdorp, 200 km east of Cape Town. Rooi Els was where the engine-test facilities were located. Development continued even after South African renunciation of its nuclear weapons for use as a commercial satellite launcher. Development actually reached its height in 1992, a year after nuclear renunciation, with 50–70 companies involved, employing 1300–1500 people from the public and private sector. A much heavier ICBM or space launch vehicle, the RSA-4, with a first stage in the Peacekeeper ICBM class but with Jericho-2/RSA-3 upper-stage components was in development.

In June 1994 the RSA-3 / RSA-4 South African satellite launcher program was cancelled.

Proposed LK civilian launch variants 
In 1998, Israel Space Agency partnered with U.S. Coleman Research Corporation (now a division of L-3 Communications) to develop the LK family of small launch vehicles. In 2001, a new French joint-venture, LeoLink, between Astrium and Israel Aircraft Industries, was created to market the LK variant. It is believed that in 2002 development of the LK variant was discontinued.

The LK-1 was closely based on the Shavit-2, but with motors and other components built in the United States to satisfy U.S. government requirements. The LK-2 was a larger vehicle using a Thiokol Castor 120 motor as its first stage. The third stage was either a standard AUS-51 motor built under license by Atlantic Research Corp., or a Thiokol Star 48 motor. All launch vehicles would have had a small monopropellant hydrazine fourth stage.
 LK-A – for 350 kg-class satellites in 240 × 600 km elliptical polar orbits.
 LK-1 – for 350 kg-class satellites in 700 km circular polar orbits.
 LK-2 – for 800 kg-class satellites in 700 km circular polar orbits.

A Shavit LK air-launched satellite launcher was proposed by ISA and Israel Aircraft Industries (IAI). The booster would have been a standard Shavit-1 or Shavit-2 without a first stage that would be dropped from a Hercules C-130. An alternative proposal consisted of a full launch stack carried atop Boeing 747 aircraft, similar to how the Space Shuttle was carried, through the Straits of Tiran and past the Arabian Peninsula into open sea; this called for a zoom-climb launch over the Indian Ocean, permitting the eastward boost from the rotation of the Earth rather than launching into a westward retrograde orbit over the Mediterranean, nearly doubling the maximum payload weight.

Comparable solid fuel rockets 

 ASLV
 Minotaur
 Mu
 Pegasus
 Start-1

 VLS-1
 SSLV

See also 

 Comparison of orbital launchers families
 Comparison of orbital launch systems

References 

Space launch vehicles of Israel
Solid-fuel rockets
MLM products
Expendable space launch systems
Vehicles introduced in 1988
Israel–South Africa relations